William Baillie (12 November 1838 – 17 March 1895) was an English cricketer who played for Gloucestershire. He was born in Duntisbourne Abbots and died in Paddington.

Baillie made a single first-class appearance for the side, during the 1870 season, against Marylebone Cricket Club. From the lower-middle order, he scored 7 runs in the only innings in which he batted, as Gloucestershire won the match by an innings margin.

External links
William Baillie at Cricket Archive 

1838 births
1895 deaths
English cricketers
Gloucestershire cricketers
People from Cotswold District
Cricketers from Gloucestershire